The women's 1500 metres event at the 1997 European Athletics U23 Championships was held in Turku, Finland, on 12 July 1997.

Medalists

Results

Final
12 July

Participation
According to an unofficial count, 16 athletes from 11 countries participated in the event.

 (1)
 (1)
 (1)
 (1)
 (2)
 (1)
 (2)
 (2)
 (2)
 (2)
 (1)

References

1500 metres
1500 metres at the European Athletics U23 Championships